

aca-acc
acadesine (INN)
acamprosate (INN)
acaprazine (INN)
acarbose (INN)
Accolate (AstraZeneca), also known as zafirlukast
Accoleit (AstraZeneca), also known as zafirlukast
Accuneb, racemic albuterol
Accupril
Accurbron
Accure (Alphapharm), also known as isotretinoin
Accuretic (Parke-Davis)
Accutane (Roche), also known as isotretinoin
Accuzyme

ace

aceb-aceo
acebrochol (INN)
aceburic acid (INN)
Acebutolol HCl
acebutolol (INN)
acecainide (INN)
acecarbromal (INN)
aceclidine (INN)
aceclofenac (INN)
acedapsone (INN)
acediasulfone (INN)
acedoben (INN)
acefluranol (INN)
acefurtiamine (INN)
acefylline clofibrol (INN)
acefylline piperazine (INN)
aceglatone (INN)
aceglutamide (INN)
acemannan (INN)
acemetacin (INN)
aceneuramic acid (INN)
acenocoumarol (INN)
Aceon

acep-aces
aceperone (INN)
Acephen
acepromazine (INN)
aceprometazine (INN)
acequinoline (INN)
acesulfame (INN)

acet-acex
Acetadote (Cumberland Pharmaceuticals)
acetaminophen (USAN), also known as paracetamol
acetaminosalol (INN)
acetarsol (INN)
Acetasol
Acetated Ringer's
acetazolamide (INN)
acetergamine (INN)
acetiamine (INN)
acetiromate (INN)
acetohexamide
acetohexamide (INN)
acetohydroxamic acid (INN)
acetophenazine (INN)
acetorphine (INN)
Acetoxyl
acetryptine (INN)
acetylcholine chloride (INN)
acetylcysteine (INN)
acetyldigitoxin (INN)
acetylleucine (INN)
acetylmethadol (INN)
acevaltrate (INN)
acexamic acid (INN)

ach-aco
Aches-N-Pain
Achromycin
Aci-jel
aciclovir (INN)
acifran (INN)
Acihexal (Hexal Australia) [Au], also known as aciclovir
Acilac
Aciphex
acipimox (INN)
acitazanolast (INN)
acitemate (INN)
acitretin (INN)
acivicin (INN)
aclantate (INN)
aclarubicin (INN)
aclatonium napadisilate (INN)
aclidinium bromide (USAN, INN)
Aclovate
acolbifene (USAN)
acodazole (INN)
aconiazide (INN)
acotiamide (USAN)
acoxatrine (INN)

acr
acreozast (INN)
acridorex (INN)
acriflavinium chloride (INN)
acrihellin (INN)
acrisorcin (INN)
acrivastine (INN)
acrocinonide (INN)
acronine (INN)

act
Act-A-Med
actagardin (INN)
Actagen-C
Actahist
actaplanin (INN)
actarit (INN)
ACTH
Acthar
ActHIB
Acthrel
Acticin
Acticort
Actidil
Actidose
Actifed
Actigall
Actin-N
Actimmune (Vidara Therapeutics)
Actinex
actinoquinol (INN)
Actiq (Cephalon)
Actisite
actisomide (INN)
Activase (Genentech)
Activella
actodigin (INN)
Actonel (Sanofi-Aventis) redirects to risedronate 
Actos (Takeda, Eli Lilly) redirects to pioglitazone
Actron

acu-acy
ACU-Dyne
Acular
Acutect
Acyclovir (USAN), also known as aciclovir
Acylanid
Acys-5